Michael Mathew Walker  is a biologist at University of Auckland notable for his work engaging with Māori students. He established a mentoring program called Tuākana more than 20 years ago, which pairs first year Māori students with more experienced students in an effort to reduce the previously-high drop-out rate. He is of Te Whakatōhea descent.

Walker was elected a Fellow of the Royal Society of New Zealand Te Apārangi in 2003, while in 2009, he was appointed an Officer of the New Zealand Order of Merit for services to science.

In 2011, he won the Prime Minister’s Supreme Award, and a sustained excellence in teaching in a kaupapa Māori context award.

References

Scientists from Auckland
Academic staff of the University of Auckland
New Zealand Māori academics
Living people
New Zealand biologists
Whakatōhea people
Year of birth missing (living people)
Māori and Pacific Island scientists
Officers of the New Zealand Order of Merit
Fellows of the Royal Society of New Zealand